"Don't Mess With Doctor Dream" is a 1985 song by the British band Thompson Twins. It was released as a single from their album Here's to Future Days, and peaked at No. 15 in the UK, spending six weeks on the chart. Written by bandmembers Tom Bailey, Alannah Currie and Joe Leeway, it is an anti-drug song warning of the dangers of drug addiction. It was the first Thompson Twins single to be co-produced by Nile Rodgers. A promotional music video was made for the single which was directed by Godley & Creme along with Meiert Avis.

The B-side, "Big Business", was exclusive to this single with two versions: 7" version and an extended version called "Very Big Business".

Critical reception
On its release, Paul Sexton of Record Mirror considered "Don't Mess with Doctor Dream" to have "commendable anti-heroin sentiments", but felt the song was "rather a plodder compared to the pop craft of the singles from Into the Gap".

Formats 
7" UK vinyl single (1985) Arista TWINS 9
"Don't Mess With Doctor Dream" - 3:36
"Big Business" - 4:13

12" UK vinyl single (1985) Arista TWINS 129
"Don't Mess With Doctor Dream" (Smackattack!) – 6:10
"Very Big Business" - 5:06

12" UK vinyl single (1985) Arista TWINS 229
"Don't Mess With Doctor Dream" ((U4A) + (U3A) = Remix) – 6:38
"Very Big Business" - 5:06

Personnel 
Written by  Tom Bailey, Alannah Currie, and Joe Leeway.
Tom Bailey – vocals, piano, Fairlight, synthesizers, guitar, contrabass, Fairlight and drum programming
Alannah Currie – lyrics, marimba, backing vocals, acoustic drums, percussion, tuned percussion
Joe Leeway – backing vocals, congas, Z-bass, Emulator, percussion
 Produced by Nile Rodgers and Tom Bailey
 Mixed by James Farber
 Mixed at Skyline Studio, NYC
 Photography – Rebecca Blake
 Artwork/Design – Andie Airfix, Satori
 Art Direction – Alannah

Chart performance

Official versions

References 

1985 singles
Thompson Twins songs
Songs written by Alannah Currie
Songs written by Tom Bailey (musician)
Song recordings produced by Nile Rodgers
Songs written by Joe Leeway
Music videos directed by Godley and Creme
Music videos directed by Meiert Avis
1985 songs
Arista Records singles